Bemina is a region in the city of Srinagar, the summer capital of Jammu and Kashmir, India. It lies in the Batamaloo Assembly Constituency, Batamaloo assembly segment of the Srinagar parliamentary constituency.

Etymology
Bemina was originally called "Abhimanyupur".

History
Bemina was a nabal before it was developed by srinagar development 
authority .

Flood plain
Bemina was settled on the local floodplains of adjoining rivers. Unplanned and haphazard construction led to usurpation of flood plains. A direct consequence of this is that it is one of the most flood prone areas in the Srinagar city.

References

Neighbourhoods in Srinagar